Gabriel J. Campana (born July 6, 1963) is an American politician. He served as the 39th mayor of Williamsport, Pennsylvania. He assumed office in January 2008 and won re-elections in 2011 and 2015 before leaving in 2020. In the May 2019 Republican primary election, he ran for Lycoming County Commission but only received 11% of the vote, coming in fourth in the race for two nominations. On October 7, 2019, he announced that he was running a write-in campaign for mayor in the November election.

Political career
Campana has been the mayor of Williamsport, Pennsylvania since 2008. He is the only Williamsport Mayor in modern times to win 3 terms.  During his tenure, crime has been cut and economic development has increased. Campana won re-election in 2011 by a 74% to 26% margin.

Campana is a supporter of fracking and the natural gas industry. He purchased a natural gas-powered car, but ended up getting rid of it since it wasn't economical.

He was a school teacher and 12 year member of the City Council before being elected mayor.

Personal life
Mayor Gabriel Campana is one of 11 siblings born and raised in Williamsport.  His father, the late Dr. Louis F. Campana, was a local physician and his late mother Rose Campana, was a nurse.  Campana has 5 children.

References

      

National Registrar's Who's Who in Education (2006-New York, New York)
Teacher Named to Fill Council Vacancy (Williamsport Sun Gazette-January 5, 1996)

1963 births
Living people
Mayors of Williamsport, Pennsylvania
Pennsylvania Republicans
Temple University alumni
Bloomsburg University of Pennsylvania alumni
Wilkes University alumni
Pennsylvania city council members